Cynanchum violator is a species of flowering plant in the family Apocynaceae, native to wet tropical areas of Táchira state, Venezuela. A scrambling subshrub, it is so named because it possesses a number of character traits 
often used to delimitate sections and even genera in related taxa.

References

violator
Endemic flora of Venezuela
Plants described in 1953